In mathematics, specifically abstract algebra, a linearly ordered or totally ordered group is a group G equipped with a total order "≤" that is translation-invariant. This may have different meanings. We say that (G, ≤) is a:

 left-ordered group if ≤ is left-invariant, that is a ≤ b implies ca ≤ cb for all a, b, c in G,
 right-ordered group if ≤ is right-invariant, that is  a ≤ b implies ac ≤ bc for all a, b, c in G,
 bi-ordered group if ≤ is bi-invariant, that is it is both left- and right-invariant. 

A group G is said to be left-orderable (or right-orderable, or bi-orderable) if there exists a left- (or right-, or bi-) invariant order on G. A simple necessary condition for a group to be left-orderable is to have no elements of finite order; however this is not a sufficient condition. It is equivalent for a group to be left- or right-orderable; however there exist left-orderable groups which are not bi-orderable.

Further definitions 

In this section  is a left-invariant order on a group  with identity element . All that is said applies to right-invariant orders with the obvious modifications. Note that  being left-invariant is equivalent to the order  defined by  if and only if  being right-invariant. In particular a group being left-orderable is the same as it being right-orderable. 

In analogy with ordinary numbers we call an element  of an ordered group positive if .

The positive cone  characterises the order ; indeed, by left-invariance we see that  if and only if . In fact a left-ordered group can be defined as a group  together with a subset  satisfying the two conditions that:
for  we have also ;

The left-invariant order  is bi-invariant if and only if it is conjugacy invariant, that is if  then for any  we have  as well. This is equivalent to the positive cone being stable under inner automorphisms. 

If in addition the group  is abelian, then for any  a triangle inequality is satisfied: .

Examples

Any left- or right-orderable group is torsion-free, that is it contains no elements of finite order besides the identity. Conversely, F. W. Levi showed that a torsion-free abelian group is bi-orderable; this is still true for nilpotent groups but there exist torsion-free, finitely presented groups which are not left-orderable.

Archimedean ordered groups

Otto Hölder showed that every Archimedean group (a bi-ordered group satisfying an Archimedean property) is isomorphic to a subgroup of the additive group of real numbers, .
If we write the Archimedean l.o. group multiplicatively, this may be shown by considering the Dedekind completion,  of the closure of a l.o. group under th roots. We endow this space with the usual topology of a linear order, and then it can be shown that for each  the exponential maps  are well defined order preserving/reversing, topological group isomorphisms. Completing a l.o. group can be difficult in the non-Archimedean case. In these cases, one may classify a group by its rank: which is related to the order type of the largest sequence of convex subgroups.

Other examples

Free groups are left-orderable. More generally this is also the case for right-angled Artin groups. Braid groups are also left-orderable.

The group given by the presentation  is torsion-free but not left-orderable; note that it is a 3-dimensional crystallographic group (it can be realised as the group generated by two glided half-turns with orthogonal axes and the same translation length), and it is the same group that was proven to be a counterexample to the unit conjecture. More generally the topic of orderability of 3--manifold groups is interesting for its relation with various topological invariants. There exists a 3-manifold group which is left-orderable but not bi-orderable (in fact it does not satisfy the weaker property of being locally indicable). 

Left-orderable groups have also attracted interest from the perspective of dynamical systems cas it is known that a countable group is left-orderable if and only if it acts on the real line by homeomorphisms.

See also
Cyclically ordered group
Hahn embedding theorem
Partially ordered group

Notes

References

Ordered groups